Republicanism in Spain is a political position and movement that holds that Spain should be a republic.

There has existed in Spain a persistent trend of republican thought, especially throughout the 19th, 20th, and 21st centuries, that has manifested itself in diverse political parties and movements over the entire course of the history of Spain. While these movements have shared the objective of establishing a republic, during these three centuries there have surged distinct schools of thought on the form republicans would want to give to the Spanish State: unitary or federal.

Despite the country's long-lasting schools of republican movements, the government of Spain has been organized as a republic during only two short periods in its history, which totaled 9 years and 8 months of republican government. The First Spanish Republic lasted from February 1873 to December 1874, and the Second Spanish Republic lasted from April 1931 to April 1939.

Under the monarchical regime currently in force in Spain, there are movements and political parties throughout the entire political spectrum that advocate for a Third Spanish Republic. Despite enjoying a wider support within the left wing political camp, there are also liberal, right-wing, conservative and nationalist parties espousing republican stances.

History

Origins, the First Republic, and the Bourbon Restoration
The roots of Spanish republicanism arose out of liberal thought in the wake of the French Revolution. The first manifestations of republicanism occurred during the Peninsular War, in which Spain and nearby regions fought for independence from Napoleon, 1808–1814. During the reign of Ferdinand VII (1813–1833) there were several liberalist military pronunciamientos, but it was not until the reign of Isabella II (1833–1868) that the first clearly republican and anti-monarchist movements appeared.

A search for a new monarch among several European royal courts ensued and the Italian prince Amadeo I of Savoy was chosen. But Spain was in a period of profound instability: Legitimist monarchist Carlists (reactionaries and staunch defenders of the Ancien régime) had  launched another war against the country's progressive direction; there was colonial unrest in Spanish Cuba via the Ten Years' War; and the moderate-liberal monarchy was met with stiff opposition from all sides, by republicans to its left, and from its right by a large part of the aristocracy and the Catholic Church; thus King Amadeo abdicated on 11 February 1873.

On that same day in 1873, the Cortes proclaimed the First Spanish Republic.

However, the Republic fell victim to the same instabilities provoked by the ongoing wars and the division amongst republicans. The majority of republicans were Federalists, and they therefore supported the formation of a federal democratic republic, but there was also a unitary republican current. Moreover, within the Federalists there was an intransigent pro-confederation sector that was infuriated and later quashed by the Cantonal Revolution of 1873. The complicated political situation is demonstrated by the fact that in just eleven months there were four presidents of the Republic: Estanislao Figueras, Francisco Pi y Margall, Nicolás Salmerón and Emilio Castelar.

On 3 January 1874, General Manuel Pavía led a coup d'état that established a unitary republican dictatorship presided by Marshal Francisco Serrano. The regime was followed by a pronunciamiento on 29 December 1874 in Sagunto, in which Brigadier General Arsenio Martínez Campos proclaimed the need to restore the monarchy. Following the acceptance of the coup by the Captain General of Madrid, Fernando Primo de Rivera, a new government led by Antonio Cánovas del Castillo was formed putting and end to the Republic, bringing the so-called Restoration and the ascension of Alfonso XII (son of Isabella II) to the throne.

After being banished from the institutions, republicanism underwent a heap of troubles, with differences of approach becoming apparent between those followers of Pimargallian "pactist" federalism and those ready to jump into Castelar's possibilism in regard of the new conservative regime. Castelar led the Partido Demócrata—later the Partido Demócrata Posibilista (PDP) and Cristino Martos the Partido Progresista Demócrata. Nonetheless, these parties, immersed in a system of unequal censitary suffrage between 1878 and 1890, were unable to compete with the large dynastic parties: the Liberal-Conservative Party of Cánovas del Castillo and Liberal–Fusionist Party of Sagasta. Later Pi y Margall formed the Partido Republicano Democrático Federal (PRDF), Manuel Ruiz Zorrilla and José María Esquerdo created the Partido Republicano Progresista (PRP), and Nicolás Salmerón established the Partido Republicano Centralista (PRC). These parties contributed a diverse set of independent republican deputies to the Spanish parliament.

Factions of the PDP and the PRP branched off and fused to form the Partido Republicano Nacional. In 1898 the Fusión Republicana was formed, and in 1903 the creation of the Republican Union Party attempted to represent and fuse all streams of republican thought. However, two parties split from the Republican Union: Alejandro Lerroux's Partido Republicano Radical and Vicente Blasco's Partido de Unión Republicana Autonomista. In that time the Catalan Centre Nacionalista Republicà (CNR) appeared. Following the acts of "Tragic Week" in Barcelona in 1909, republican parties and the Spanish Socialist Workers' Party ("PSOE" in Spanish) joined together to form the Conjunción Republicano-Socialista, at the same time as the Catalan sectors of the Republican Union, the CNR, and the PRDF formed the Republican Nationalist Federal Union. Later Melquíades Álvarez split from the Conjunción Republicano-Socialista to form the Reformist Party.

Primo de Rivera, the Second Republic, and Francoist Spain

After 1917, the Restoration regime entered a state of crisis, which finally resulted in the coup d'état of Miguel Primo de Rivera, Captain-General of Catalonia. Primo de Rivera established a dictatorship with the approval of the King Alfonso XIII. But the crisis of this dictatorship lead to the resignation of Primo de Rivera in 1930 and made the fall of the monarchy inevitable. The bulk of Republican forces convened in August 1930 and reached an agreement, the Pact of San Sebastián, delimiting a common strategy to bring the republic, also conforming a revolutionary committee. On 14 April 1931, two days after a round of municipal elections (understood as a plebiscite on monarchy) in which republicans won a landslide victory, Alfonso XIII fled the country, the Second Spanish Republic was proclaimed and a provisional government presided by Niceto Alcalá Zamora was formed.

The Second Republic adopted the form of a unitary republic, allowing a group of provinces to form self-governing regions, a provision availed of to form the regions of Catalonia and the Basque Country. Its first President of the Republic (head of state) was Niceto Alcalá Zamora, of the liberal-Catholic Liberal Republican Right party.

After the victory of the socialist and left-republican coalition in the June 1931 elections, Manuel Azaña, of Republican Action (later the Republican Left) was elected president of the Council of Ministers (premier). Azaña's government attempted to pass many reforms, such as the Agrarian Reform Law, and is consequently known as the Bienio Reformista ("Two Reformist Years"). 1931 also saw the introduction of  truly universal suffrage, for the first time in Spanish history: previously restricted to men, the right to vote was now extended to women.

The Republic soon had to confront the political polarization of the era, at the same time that totalitarian dictatorships were rising in power in Europe. The political instability of the time can be seen by the fact that, in 1932, there had already been a failed coup led by General José Sanjurjo.

The general elections of 1933 saw the emergence of José María Gil-Robles's Confederación Española de Derechas Autónomas, an umbrella organisation of various conservative and Catholic-nationalist parties. The CEDA emerged as the largest single parliamentary group, but lacked a majority of its own. As a result, Alcalá Zamora opted to appoint a cabinet made up of various centre-right radical and liberal parties led by Alejandro Lerroux. This cabinet too suffered from too narrow a majority, and Lerroux was eventually obliged to extend its support by including several CEDA ministers.

The inclusion of the CEDA, considered to be insincere in its support for the existing regime, was the trigger for the incidents of October 1934. Various initiatives were launched, ranging from  a declaration of federal autonomy by Lluís Companys, head of the government of the Catalan region, designed to limit the CEDA's ability to intervene in the region; a general strike by the socialist movement, designed to dissuade Alcala and Lerroux from including the CEDA ministers; and a worker uprising in the northern region of Asturias that united the local branches of the socialist movement to those of the Communist Party of Spain and the syndicalist National Confederation of Labour.

The violent repression of the Rising, especially in Asturias, the suppression of Catalan home rule, and the arrest of numerous prominent political figures who had been uninvolved in the unrest, motived the formation of the Spanish Popular Front. This included the socialist movement (the PSOE and UGT), the communist PCE and POUM parties, and the left-republican parties Republican Left, the Republican Union and Catalan Republican Left, as well as several minor political parties.

The Popular Front emerged victorious in the legislative elections of 1936, forming a government of republican parties and elevating Manuel Azaña as head of state.

On 17 July 1936, there was a military uprising that failed to seize control of government but which, by taking control of much of Spanish Morocco, provoked the outbreak of the Spanish Civil War. While the republican regime was abandoned by the other European democracies and only received military support from the Soviet Union, the nationalist rebels were supported by Nazi Germany and fascist Italy, whose support was pivotal in the final victory of the nationalist uprising. The triumphant Nationalist faction established the Spanish State that lasted until Francisco Franco's death and the subsequent Spanish transition to democracy. Emilio Mola, leader of the uprising against the Second Republic, attempted to establish a "republican dictatorship," but in 1947 Franco declared his authoritarian reign as a regency for the monarchy, naming Juan Carlos de Borbón, grandson of the ousted Alfonso XIII, as his successor and the next king in 1969. Juan Carlos ascended to the throne upon the  Caudillo's death in 1975.

Exile and Holocaust 
A Spanish Republican government in exile was established in Paris in April 1939. Thousands of Republicans fled the country to France as well. Many of them were captured after France was occupied by Nazi Germany in 1940; some 7,000 died in concentration camps, especially Mauthausen-Gusen, during the Holocaust. The Republican government in exile moved to Mexico City in 1940, returning to Paris in 1946.

Transition to democracy

The anti-Francoist opposition failed in their attempts to bring about Francoist Spain's downfall, and after his death they started a process of negotiation with the government that led to the Spanish transition to democracy. In 1977, after the first democratic general elections since the 1930s, the Spanish Republican government-in-exile, maintained since their defeat in the Civil War, dissolved itself and officially recognized the post-Francoist democracy. Spain established a constitution with democratic parliamentary monarchy as the form of government. The constitution was supported by UCD, PSOE, PCE, AP, PDPC and UDC-CCC. During the drafting of the constitution, UCD, AP and PCE supported the monarchy as the form of government. PSOE abstained on that point and supported an amendment to establish a republic. However, in the 80s, the Communist Party (PCE) and its coalition the United Left resumed advocating for a Third Spanish Republic. There are also other regional parties advocating republicanism.

In 2016 an unpublished interview with the former president Adolfo Suarez in 1995 came to light, where he confesses that he included the word king and monarchy in the 1977 Political Reform Law so as not to have to consult the issue of the monarchy to the citizenry, as polls told him he would lose.

In 2018, the Catalan parliament passed a motion condemning king Felipe VI for his role in the Catalan crisis and demanding the abolition of the monarchy.

Public opinion
Spain's government-run Centro de Investigaciones Sociológicas ("CIS", Sociological Research Centre) has not conducted any surveys in which respondents were asked their preference of the system of government, monarchy or republic. However, the CIS has published surveys on the "value" respondents place on the monarchy, and the agency has occasionally published questions regarding the current monarch, observing a progressive decline in support for the monarchy. In fact, although the monarchy has normally been one of the most valued institutions, studies have shown that the monarchy has experienced serious loss in public confidence, more than any other government institution, especially among youths aged 18 to 24, who have expressed negative opinions about it repeatedly in CIS studies since 2006. For the first time ever in 2011, a majority of the population said they did not support the current monarchy. However, the CIS ceased surveying views of the monarchy after April 2015, when poll respondents gave it an average rating of 4.34 out of 10.

A study published on 24 June 2004, even yield a result of 55% of Spaniards agreeing ("más bien de acuerdo") with the statement that "the Monarchy has overstayed its welcome." In 2016, it was revealed that during a 1995 interview, Adolfo Suárez had confessed that he included the word 'King' in the 1977 Political Reform Act in order to avoid a referendum on republic, as secret surveys reportedly commissioned by the State did not deliver a favorable results for the monarchist option back at the time.
Spanish newspapers also sporadically publish surveys and opinion polls with questions related to the monarchy and of the survey respondents political affiliation as monarchists or republican, among other options, with results generably in favor of the monarchy until the year 2013:

After 2005, surveys have measured a larger support for republicanism amongst Spanish youth, with more 18- to 29-year-olds identifying themselves as republicans than those identifying as monarchists, according to El Mundo. Despite this, some surveys show the public in favour of the monarchy, and according to an August 2008 El Mundo poll, 47.9% of Spaniards would have liked to democratically elect King Juan Carlos, and 42.3% of respondents thought that the succession of his heir Prince Felipe should be put to a plebiscite. According to the newspaper Público's "Publicscopio" section in December 2009, 61% survey respondents were in favour of amending the Spanish Constitution to allow the Spanish people to decide between a monarchy and a republic, a number that increased by 3% compared to the data collected the year before by the same newspaper. According to a 2012 survey by Gallup, 54% of Spaniards were in favor of a referendum to choose the form of government (monarchy or republic), and support was always found to be even higher when surveying younger age groups (support was 73.1% amongst 18- to 24-year-olds, but only 34.5% for those above 65 years). Support for such a referendum is also higher amongst the more educated groups of the population, voters in left-wing political parties, and between members of the upper and upper-middle classes. In 2013, as a result of the accusation of Princess Cristina in the Nóos scandal, republican support has begun to increase greater than ever before.

When Juan Carlos announced his abdication on 2 June 2014, thousands of protesters took to the squares of several Spanish towns and cities demanding a referendum on whether the monarchy should continue. Subsequent surveys showed that the abdication improved the image of the Crown thanks to a positive image of the new king, Felipe VI, but since then, support for the monarchy has dropped to a technical tie between its supporters and supporters of the republic, according to surveys in recent years, therefore becoming the European country with the highest percentage of detractors of the current monarchical state model.

Political party positions

The Spanish Socialist Workers' Party (PSOE) is the main centre-left Spanish political party and the one that has spent the most years in government since the Transition (1982–1996, 2004–2011, 2018–present). Since the approval of the Constitution, the party maintains a position of limited intervention in the republic-vs.-monarchy debate, providing some support to the monarchy while at the same time many grassroot members self-identify as republican. In recent years the monarchy and its role have been praised by the PSOE. However, the youth wing of the PSOE, the Socialist Youth of Spain (JSE), openly advocates for the establishment of a republic, and in its resolutions of the 37th Congress (2004–2008), the PSOE declared itself in support of a "civic republicanism". The mentions of republicanism disappeared in the resolutions of the 38th Congress due to internal conflict over this position. Current social-democratic leader and Prime Minister, Pedro Sánchez, who identifies himself as republican, has asserted more than once that "The PSOE is a republican party, but constitutional" and "We Republicans feel very well represented in this parliamentary monarchy that we have". In the 39th PSOE Congress, Pedro Sanchez's team negotiated for the withdrawal of an amendment from the Socialist Youth that demanded "implanting the republic as a model of the State through a constitutional reform and the convening of a referendum". The amendment was withdrawn and the resolution finally stated that "PSOE has its own conception of the State model and the form of government towards which it wants to advance, strengthening republican values and promoting a federal model".
The conservative People's Party (PP) strongly supports the monarchy.
The far-right party Vox supports the monarchy. However, its leader Santiago Abascal has defended that "Spain, its sovereignty and its unity are above the Monarchy, the Republic, the Constitution and Democracy", suggesting a conditional support to the Crown.

Unidas Podemos is a left-wing to far-left electoral alliance formed by Podemos, United Left (IU) and other left-wing parties. It entered a coalition government with the PSOE in 2020.
 Podemos advocates to establish a republic holding a referendum on whether or not to abolish the monarchy. Current leader, Pablo Iglesias, said that he does not advocate changing to a presidential republic but maintain parliamentary democracy.
The United Left (IU) is a federation of left-wing parties and organizations dominated by the Communist Party of Spain (PCE). The IU states its mission is "to transform gradually the capitalist economic, social, and political system into a democratic socialist system, founded on the principles of justice, social equality, solidarity, respect of nature, and organized in conformity with a federal and republican "state of rights". IU and the PCE advocate the establishment of a Third Spanish Republic.
The right-of-centre Citizens does not have a defined position vis-à-vis the form of government but the party has praised the monarchy and its role. Former leader, Albert Rivera, declared that he does not define himself as a monarchist.
 Más País advocates to establish a "federal republic".
 Equo is a green eco-socialist party. Equo advocates for a "federal, secular, and republican state".
Republican Left of Catalonia (ERC), Junts and CUP all advocate to establish a Catalan republic and are strongly against the present monarchy.

Constitutional procedure to establish a republic

Title X of the Spanish Constitution establishes that the approval of a new constitution or the approval of any constitutional amendment affecting the Preliminary Title, or Section I of Chapter II of Title I (on Fundamental Rights and Public Liberties) or Title II (on the Crown), the so-called "protected provisions", are subject to a special process that requires:

 that two-thirds of each House approve the amendment,
 that elections are called immediately thereafter,
 that two-thirds of each new House approves the amendment, and
 that the amendment is approved by the people in a referendum.

See also
History of Spain
Politics of Spain
Republicanism
Spanish Monarchy
First Spanish Republic
Second Spanish Republic
Spanish Civil War
Francoist Spain
Alliance of European Republican Movements

Notes

References

Bibliography

External links

Red Inter Civico Republicana, a Spanish republican movement.
Alliance of European Republican Movements, the umbrella organization of the RICP.

 
Politics of Spain
Political movements in Spain
Spain